PK-35 or PK 35 may refer to:

PK-35 (women), a Finnish football club based in Helsinki
PK-35 Vantaa (women), a Finnish football club based in Vantaa
PK-35 Vantaa (men), a former Finnish football team based in Vantaa
Constituency PK-35 (Swabi-V), Khyber Pakhtunkhwa Assembly, Pakistan
Soviet patrol ship PK-35, an MO-4-class patrol ship wrecked in August 1945
PK 35, the Wentzelplatz station of the Hamburg Police
PK 35, the Mountboy point on the Briare Canal
PK 35, the Lys River point on the Canal de la Deûle
PK 35, the Pargny-Filain point on the Canal de l'Oise à l'Aisne